Sadpur is a census town in the Habra I CD block in the Barasat Sadar subdivision in the North 24 Parganas district in the Indian state of West Bengal.

Geography

Location

Sadpur, Maslandapur, Nokpul and Betpuli form a cluster of census towns, south of Gobardanga. The Jamuna separates Gobardanga from this cluster. Habra police station serves this area.

Area overview
The area covered in the map alongside is largely a part of the north Bidyadhari Plain. located in the lower Ganges Delta. The country is flat. It is a little raised above flood level and the highest ground borders the river channels.54.67% of the people of the densely populated area lives in the urban areas and 45.33% lives in the rural  areas.

Note: The map alongside presents some of the notable locations in the subdivision. All places marked in the map are linked in the larger full screen map.

Demographics
According to the 2011 Census of India, Sadpur had a total population of 7,737, of which 3,946 (51%) were males and 3,827 (49%) were females. The population in the age range 0-6 years of age was 641. The total number of literate persons in Sadpur was 6,325 (88.68% of the population over 6 years).

At the 2001 census, Sadpur had a population of 6,742. Males constituted 51% of the population and females 49%. Sadpur has an average literacy rate of 78%, higher than the then national average of 59.5%: male literacy was 83% and female literacy 73%. 10% of the population were under 6 years of age.

Infrastructure
As per District Census Handbook 2011, Sadpur covered an area of 1.63 km2. It had 2 primary schools, the nearest middle, secondary and senior secondary schools were 1 km away at Maslandapur.

Transport
Sadpur is beside State Highway 3.

Machhalandapur railway station, located nearby at Maslandapur, on the Sealdah-Bangaon branch line, is 53.5 km from Sealdah and is part of the Kolkata Suburban Railway system.

Education
Gobardanga Hindu College at Gobardanga is located nearby.

Healthcare
Maslandapur Rural Hospital at Maslandapur with 30 beds, located nearby, functions as the main medical facility in Habra I CD Block.

See also
 Map of Habra I CD Block on Page 289 of District Census Handbook.

References

Cities and towns in North 24 Parganas district